The KTO Rosomak (Kołowy Transporter Opancerzony Rosomak) (pol. wheeled armored personnel carrier Wolverine)  is an 8×8 multi-role military vehicle produced by Rosomak S.A. (formerly Wojskowe Zakłady Mechaniczne) in Siemianowice Śląskie (Upper Silesia), a Polish Armaments Group company. The vehicle is a licensed variant of the Finnish Patria's armored modular vehicle.

History 
In December 2002, the Polish Ministry of National Defense signed a contract to buy 690 Patria AMV vehicles, to be manufactured in Poland. The main competitors of the AMV were the MOWAG Piranha and Steyr Pandur. As part of the initial order, 690 vehicles were to be delivered in two basic variants: 313 combat IFVs and 377 transport-special base vehicles. In October 2013 the order increased to 997 for delivery between 2014 and 2019.

The name "Rosomak" (Polish for "Wolverine") was chosen following a contest organized by the Nowa Technika Wojskowa magazine. The Rosomak  replaced the obsolete OT-64 SKOT APCs and partially the BWP-1 IFV currently in service with the Polish Land Forces.

Variants

Variants in use by Polish military 

 Rosomak - Infantry fighting vehicle variant with an Oto Melara Hitfist-30P gun turret armed with a 30 mm ATK Mk 44 chain gun and 7.62mm NATO UKM-2000C machine gun. The turret has advanced fire control systems with thermal sights and an Obra laser warning system connected to six 81 mm 902A ZM Dezamet smoke grenade launchers. Infantry fighting vehicle variant modified for war in Afghanistan was called "Rosomak"-M1M, it was equipped with  additional steel-composite armor, upgraded communications, wire cutters in front of driver and commander hatch, video cameras showing back and sides of vehicle on two LCD screens in troop compartment, Pilar system that detects the direction of fire. Because of additional armor this variant cannot float and has no water propellers. This variant was further upgraded to standard known as M1M. Most noticeable change is addition of QinetiQ RPGNet anti RPG net and new "sand" camouflage. Other changes include installation of Duke anti IED system and Blue Force Tracking BMS system (systems on loan from US Army). All older ("green") Rosomaks in M1 standard also received RPG Net. Since 2022 Rosomak will be produced with ZSSW-30 unmanned turret armed with 30mm gun, UKM-2000 machine gun and Spike ATGM.
 Rosomak-M2 and M3 - Armored personnel carrier variant modified for mission in Afghanistan equipped with similar task equipment (including additional armor) as M1 variant. The main difference is that this variant is equipped with OSS-D open turret with 40 mm Mk-19 grenade launcher or 12.7 mm NSW/WKM-B heavy machine gun.
 Rosomak-S - Armored personnel carrier variant for two anti-tank teams armed with Spike anti-tank guided missile.
 Rosomak-WEM - (WEM for Wóz Ewakuacji Medycznej – lit. "medical evacuation vehicle") – armored ambulance vehicle with crew of 3, capable of transporting 3 injured soldiers on stretchers and an additional four in sitting position. The WEM-M variant for Afghanistan was equipped with additional armor and RPGNet same as in M1M variant.
 Rosomak-WRT - (WRT for Wóz Rozpoznania Technicznego – lit. "technical reconnaissance vehicle") 
 Rosomak-WSRiD - (WSRiD for Wielosensorowy System Rozpoznania i Dozoru – lit. "multisensory reconnaissance and supervision system") 
 Rosomak-AWD - (AWD for Artyleryjski Wóz Dowodzenia –  lit. "artillery command vehicle") – Command vehicle for M120K Rak mortar company fire module
 Rosomak-WD - (WD for Wóz Dowodzenia – lit. "command vehicle")M120K Rak - 120 mm mortar artillery vehicle, first delivered in July 2017.
 Rosomak-NJ - (NJ for Nauka Jazdy – lit. "driving school")

 Gallery 

 Combat history 

War in Afghanistan (2001–2021)
 The Polish Land Forces contingent, which was a part of the International Security Assistance Force operated over 100 KTO Rosomak vehicles (including five medevac versions) during the Afghanistan War. The APCs were equipped with additional steel-composite armor. In early 2008 a Polish Rosomak serving in Afghanistan (the version with upgraded armor) was attacked by the Taliban. The vehicle was hit by RPG-7 rockets, but it managed to fire back and then returned to base without any help required. In June 2008, a Rosomak was attacked by Taliban and was hit in its frontal armor with an RPG. The armour was not penetrated. In 2009, the first soldier was reported killed while traveling in a Rosomak after an improvised explosive device exploded under the vehicle, which rolled over and crushed the gunner who had been standing in the open turret. Similar attacks had occurred before but had failed to inflict casualties.
European Union mission in Chad (2007–2008)
European Union Force Chad/CAR

 Operators 
Poland is the sole user of the KTO Rosomak, but as the first export customer of Patria, AMV & WZM SA has the right to export the KTO Rosomak in some markets. In 2006 the KTO Rosomak'' was tested in Malaysia.

Polish Land Forces - 903 in different versions (as of 2020)

Forty AMV Patria manufactured in Poland

See also

Comparable vehicles

 Stryker
 LAV III/LAV AFV/LAV-25/ASLAV
 K808 Armored Personnel Carrier
 Tusan AFV
 Boxer
 Freccia IFV
 BTR-90
 CM-32
 Type 96 Armored Personnel Carrier
 Type 16 maneuver combat vehicle
 Patria AMV
 BTR-4
 Saur 2
 VBCI
 FNSS Pars
 MOWAG Piranha
 TATA  Kestrel

References

External links

 Armoured Modular Vehicles (include KTO Rosomak) on Rosomak official webpage

Wheeled armoured fighting vehicles
Military vehicles of Poland
Armoured fighting vehicles of Poland
Armoured fighting vehicles of the post–Cold War period
Eight-wheeled vehicles
Military vehicles introduced in the 2000s
Wheeled amphibious armoured fighting vehicles
Armoured personnel carriers of Poland
Infantry fighting vehicles of Poland
Amphibious infantry fighting vehicles